Paint Branch High School is a high school located in the Fairland census-designated place, an unincorporated section of Montgomery County, Maryland; it has a Burtonsville postal address.

It is named after the Paint Branch creek. The school was founded in 1969 and is part of the Montgomery County Public Schools System.  The school lies on Old Columbia Pike, between Briggs Chaney and Greencastle Road.

Paint Branch, once a rural high school now deep in the heart of suburban sprawl, is a member of the Northeast Consortium schools in Montgomery County. As a member of the Consortium, the school's signature program focuses on Science and Media education. The panther is the school's mascot and the fight song is "Hail to the Panthers", sung to the tune of "Hail to the Commanders". The school's colors are burgundy and gold, also the same as the Washington Commanders.

Athletics 
Paint Branch competes in the 4A North division in the Maryland Public Secondary Schools Athletic Association (MPSSAA). The Panthers have fielded a total of 23 state championship athletic teams, including Girls Basketball (1979, 1980, 2001, 2008), Baseball (1976, 1979, 1990, 1991), Boys' Basketball (1977, 2000), Wrestling (1978, 2001), Boys' Cross-Country (1973, 1974), Boys' Track and Field (Indoor 2003, 2019, 2020; Outdoor 2003), Girls' Track and Field (Indoor 2009, Outdoor 1989), Field Hockey (2009), Softball (1987), and Football (1975).

Notable alumni
 Darnell Dockett - Former Pro-Bowl NFL player for the Arizona Cardinals and San Francisco 49ers
 Kimmy Gatewood - actress, writer and singer
 Brian Heidik - winner of Survivor: Thailand
 Tracy Jackson - NBA basketball player
 Fredricka Whitfield - news anchor for CNN
 Eun Yang - television news anchor of WRC-TV
 Rahne Jones - American television actress

Awards 
 Awarded the "Blue Ribbon Award" in 2000
 Awarded a "New American High School Award" from the United States Department of Education in 2000

New building

A new building is now established in the location that the woods next to the football field once occupied. As the only school at that time without a new building, Paint Branch High School was guaranteed a new building when it was asked to enter the Northeast Consortium back in 1998. The new building was scheduled to be completed by the end of 2010, but budget shortfalls pushed that date until April 2012, resulting in the class of 2013 being the first class to graduate from the new building. Hess Construction Co. was awarded the contract to build the new school. Hess Construction Co. is also the builder of the Kenmore Middle School in Arlington County, Virginia. Staff moved into the new building June 18, 2012.

The old Paint Branch building, originally scheduled to be torn down in the summer of 2012 was  torn down in October 2012. Sports fields were completed by the 2013–2014 school year.

References

External links

"Mainstream", the PBHS newspaper

Burtonsville, Maryland
Fairland, Maryland
Public high schools in Montgomery County, Maryland
Educational institutions established in 1969
1969 establishments in Maryland